The 24th TCA Awards were presented by the Television Critics Association. The Smothers Brothers hosted the ceremony on July 19 at the Beverly Hilton Hotel.

Winners and nominees

Multiple wins 
The following shows received multiple wins:

Multiple nominations 
The following shows received multiple nominations:

References

External links
Official website
2008 TCA Awards at IMDb.com

2008 television awards
2008 in American television
2008 in California
TCA Awards ceremonies